Alfred Mosselman or Alfred Mosselmann (1810–1867) was a Belgian aristocrat and industrialist who made a fortune in canal- and road-building. He was also a patron of the arts, particularly of his long-time lover Apollonie Sabatier.

1810 births
1867 deaths
Belgian nobility
19th-century Belgian businesspeople
Belgian philanthropists
Regents of the Banque de France
19th-century philanthropists
19th-century industrialists